Lumber was an unincorporated community in Randolph County, West Virginia.

References 

Unincorporated communities in West Virginia
Unincorporated communities in Randolph County, West Virginia